Fritz Kraenke (1890–1947) was a German art director. He worked on the sets of more than thirty films during the silent era.

Selected filmography
 Miss Piccolo (1914)
 The Yellow Death (1920)
 The Skull of Pharaoh's Daughter (1920)
 The Railway King (1921)
 The Tiger of Circus Farini (1923)
 Maciste and the Chinese Chest (1923)
 The Great Industrialist (1923)
 Rudderless (1924)
 Adventure on the Night Express (1925)
 Swifter Than Death (1925)
 Ash Wednesday (1925)
 The Captain from Koepenick (1926)
 The Woman in Gold (1926)
 We'll Meet Again in the Heimat (1926)

References

Bibliography
 Matias Bleckman. Harry Piel: ein Kino-Mythos und seine Zeit. Filminstitut der Landeshaupstadt Düsseldorf, 1992.

External links

1890 births
1947 deaths
German art directors
German emigrants to the United States